Soni may refer to:

Places
 Soni, Maharashtra, a village in India
 Soni, Nara, a village in Japan
 Soni Falls

People
 Soni (name)
Soni Clan involved in Gold Business in Rajasthan.
 Soni (caste), a Hindu caste of goldsmiths and jewellers
 Soni (Khatri), a clan of the Khatri caste found in north India

Other
 Soni (film), a 2018 Hindi film

See also
 Sony, Japanese conglomerate 
 Sohni Mahiwal (disambiguation)